Ebbing Air National Guard Base is an airfield adjacent to the Fort Smith Regional Airport which it shares runways with.

It was established in 1953. Since 1953, the Arkansas Air National Guard's 188th Wing (188 WG) has been based at the airfield. Formerly a fighter wing that previously operated F-4 Phantom II, F-16 Fighting Falcon, and A-10 Thunderbolt II aircraft, the 188th Wing currently features three primary mission sets: Remotely Piloted Aircraft (MQ-9 Reaper); ISR (Distributed Ground Station-Arkansas); and Targeting (Space-Focused).

Air traffic services are provided by the Federal Aviation Administration (FAA) from an air traffic control (ATC) tower and TRACON (terminal radar approach control).

 
The 188th Wing is based there, currently operating drones. The Republic of Singapore Air Force is planning to set up its F-16 and F-35 training detachment starting with the first aircraft to be based there in 2023.

References

Republic of Singapore Air Force bases
Installations of the United States Air National Guard
Buildings and structures in Fort Smith, Arkansas